Sanjay Salil is a TV journalist and presenter turned media entrepreneur, founding an end-to-end media service company, MediaGuru in 2003. He hails from Nalanda, and moved to New Delhi as a youngster and chose to become a journalist in early 1990s.

Before founding MediaGuru, he worked with Amar Ujala and TV Today as an executive producer where he produced popular shows like ‘Good Morning Today’ and ‘Subah Aaj Tak'. He was also part of the founding team of Aaj Tak, India's first 24x7 news channel. He was later appointed as a CEO for Falak TV, India’s first Urdu channel.

With his hands-on experience of the Indian Television news space when the industry started to flourish, he is one of the few people in Indian media who bring to the table a varied and in-depth understanding of content, technology and business of cross media.

He is listed among successful entrepreneurs of India in the book “Small Big Bang” written by students of Indian Institute of Management, India's premier management institution in which they follow they have captured the journey of die-hard entrepreneurs from across India who dared to be different.

MediaGuru, the company founded by Sanjay Salil has been involved with the launching of key television channels like Malayala Manorama (MMTV), CSB News, TVC News, Raj TV, Rajya Sabha TV, Mathrubhumi TV, News Nation among others. Under his leadership as Managing Director, Sanjay has expanded the operations of his company from a one-man entity to a company delivering over 50 projects across 16 countries in a decade winning accolades and awards for their digitization practice.

Sanjay is awarded a Honoris Causa title, “Doctor of Excellence” for gaining expertise in the field of Business Administration, Management, and Media by KEISIE International University, South Korea.

In 2017, with his interests in blockchain and vision of digitization in media services, Sanjay co-founded River Communications
with Ankit Sharma, a product engineering lab in AI and VR.

References

Living people
Indian television journalists
Year of birth missing (living people)